Sigma Columbae, Latinized from σ Columbae, is a solitary, yellow-white hued star in the southern constellation of Columba. It is faintly visible to the naked eye with an apparent visual magnitude of 5.51. Based upon an annual parallax shift of 1.96 mas as seen from Earth, this star is located roughly 1,700 light years from the Sun.

At an age of about 400 million years, the spectrum of this star suggests this is an evolved F-type giant with a stellar classification of F2 III. It is spinning with a projected rotational velocity of about 74 km/s, which is giving the star an oblate shape with an equatorial bulge that is 10% larger than the polar radius. It has 3.79 times the mass of the Sun and is radiating 1,312 times the Sun's luminosity from its enlarged photosphere at an effective temperature of 6,820 K.

References

F-type giants
Columbae, Sigma
Columba (constellation)
Durchmusterung objects
040248
040248
2092